George Washington Brooks (March 16, 1821 – January 6, 1882) was a United States district judge of the United States District Court for the Albemarle, Cape Fear and Pamptico Districts of North Carolina and the United States District Court for the Eastern District of North Carolina.

Education and career

Born in Elizabeth City, North Carolina, Brooks read law to enter the bar in 1846. He was then in private practice in Elizabeth City until 1865, also serving as a member of the North Carolina House of Commons (now the North Carolina House of Representatives) in 1852, and from 1865 to 1866.

Federal judicial service

Brooks received a recess appointment from President Andrew Johnson on August 19, 1865, to a seat on the United States District Court for the Albemarle, Cape Fear and Pamptico Districts of North Carolina (also referenced officially as the United States District Court for the District of North Carolina) vacated by Judge Asa Biggs. He was nominated to the same position by President Johnson on December 20, 1865. He was confirmed by the United States Senate on January 22, 1866, and received his commission the same day. Brooks was reassigned by operation of law to the United States District Court for the Eastern District of North Carolina on June 4, 1872, to a new seat authorized by 17 Stat. 215. His service terminated on January 6, 1882, due to his death in Elizabeth City.

References

Sources
 

1821 births
1882 deaths
Members of the North Carolina House of Representatives
Judges of the United States District Court for the Eastern District of North Carolina
Judges of the United States District Court for the District of North Carolina
United States federal judges appointed by Andrew Johnson
19th-century American judges
19th-century American politicians
United States federal judges admitted to the practice of law by reading law
People from Elizabeth City, North Carolina